The Crown Regency Hotel and Towers is a hotel complex in Cebu City, Philippines.

The top 38th of the hotel tower feature an amusement facility which includes a roller coaster that runs around the edge of the building, and a stroll around the edge of the building with the protection of safety harnesses. There is also an elevator going from the 18th floor (Sky Lobby) all the way to the 38th floor and providing a great view of Barangay Capitol Site, Cebu City.

Project team
The Crown Regency Hotel and Towers was designed by local architectural firm T.I. Vasquez Architects & Planners Inc.,  while the structural design was made by G. E. Origenes Consulting Engineers.

Other members of the design team are CMA Engineering Consultants (Sanitary, Mechanical, and Fire Safety Works); lraido T. Legaspi, Jr. & Associates  (Electrical Works); and E.O. Bataclan & Associates (Interior Design).

The General Contractor that built the tower was ASEC Development and Construction Corporation.

Height increase
Construction has started on the roof level to increase the height of the building in order to add new rides and attractions to the Sky Extreme Adventures facilities. Initial reports indicate at least an  structure is to be added.

See also
 List of tallest buildings in the Philippines

References

External links
 Crown Regency Cebu
 Sky Experience Adventure

Skyscraper hotels in the Philippines
Hotels in Cebu